The second generation of the BMW 6 Series consists of the BMW E63 (coupe version) and BMW E64 (convertible version) grand tourers. The E63/E64 generation was produced by BMW from 2003 to 2010 and is often collectively referred to as the E63.

The E63 uses a shortened version of the E60 5 Series chassis and subsequently shares many features. The car initially drew criticism, due to its controversial styling and complicated iDrive system.

The M6 model was introduced in 2005 in coupé and convertible body styles. It is powered by the S85 V10 engine shared with the E60 M5, and most M6s were produced with a 7-speed automated manual transmission ("SMG III").

In March 2011, the BMW 6 Series (F06/F12/F13) began production as the successor to the E63.

Development and launch 
The exterior was designed by Adrian van Hooydonk, based on the 1999 BMW Z9 concept car designed by the then BMW Design Chief Chris Bangle.

The controversial rear styling, first seen on the E65 7 Series, was nicknamed "Bangle Butt" by critics. BMW described the styling philosophy as "flame surfacing", where concave and convex shapes meet to create sharp edges.

To reduce weight, the doors and bonnet are made of aluminium, and the boot and front wings are made of carbon-reinforced plastic.

Body styles

Coupé (E63) 
Coupé models were unveiled at the 2003 Frankfurt Auto Show, and introduced on the market in mid of the 2003 model year.

Convertible (E64) 
Convertible models were unveiled at the 2004 Detroit Auto Show, and released in mid 2004.

Convertible models featured a non-conventional convertible top design with side fins and an integrated wind deflector that can be raised or lowered at any time.

Engines 

Petrol

Diesel

Drivetrain 
The available transmissions are:
 6-speed ZF S6-37 manual (630Ci / 630i)
 6-speed ZF S6-53 manual (645Ci / 650i / M6)
 6-speed ZF 6HP19 automatic (630Ci / 630i)
 6-speed ZF 6HP26 automatic (635d / 645Ci / 650i)
 6-speed ZF 6HP28 automatic (635d LCI / 650i LCI)
 6-speed SMG (630i / 645Ci / 650i)
 7-speed SMG III (M6)

Unlike the related E60 5 Series, the E63/E64 was not available with all-wheel drive (xDrive).

Equipment 

Features available included adaptive headlights, parking sensors (Park Distance Control), voice control, variable rate steering (Active Steering), active anti-roll bars (Active Roll Stabilisation), radar cruise control (Active Cruise Control with Stop and Go), head-up display, lane departure warning, night vision, keyless entry and starting (Comfort Access), heated steering wheel, universal remote control, and soft-close doors.

M6 model 

The M6 version was initially introduced as a coupé at the 2005 Geneva International Motor Show, and later in convertible form at the British International Motor Show in 2006.

The majority of the cars were produced with a 7-speed automated manual transmission ("SMG III"), however a 6-speed manual transmission was also available in the United States.

The M6 coupé has a carbon fibre roof in order to reduce weight and for a lower centre of gravity. Additional features included: sports seats, larger front and rear brakes, an M-performance instrument cluster, a carbon-fibre roof (coupé only), and an optional M head-up Display. The car also has quad exhaust-pipes and larger, more aerodynamic air intakes.

A total of 9,087 coupés and 5,065 convertibles were built; amounting to 14,152 cars.

Yearly changes

2005 
 650i model replaces the 645Ci
 M6 model introduced

2007 facelift 
In September 2007, the facelift (LCI) was introduced for the 2008 model year. Major changes include:
 635d model introduced, powered by the M57 diesel engine.
 630i engine upgraded from the N52 to the N53 in countries with low sulphur fuel.
 Exterior design changes including headlights, tail-lights, bumpers, and the third brake light on coupé models was relocated to the trunk lid.
 Interior design changes including updated climate controls, and new electronic gear lever with the ability to change gears manually via steering wheel paddles.
 Edition Sport trim introduced featuring a stiffer anti-roll system and an updated exhaust system for 650i models.

2009 
 iDrive upgraded to CIC version (previously CCC)

Safety 
Models feature BMW's Advanced Safety System, enabling the car to decide the most effective deployment of the airbags in a crash. Safety equipment includes active anti-roll bars, dynamic stability control, front knee airbags (in accordance with US regulation), BMW roadside assistance, and an SOS emergency system. Convertible models also feature an automatic rollover protection system, where roll-bars behind the rear seats are automatically deployed in a rollover. From 2008, active head restraints became a standard feature on all seat options, reducing the risk of neck injuries in a rear-end collision.

Production volumes 
The E63/E64 was produced at the Dingolfing BMW plant.

The following are production figures for the E63/E64, excluding M6 models:

References

Footnotes 

6 Series
Cars introduced in 2003